The James Wimer Octagonal Barn is a barn in Lookingglass, Oregon, in the United States. It was built in 1892 and was added to the National Register of Historic Places on December 2, 1985.

See also
 National Register of Historic Places listings in Douglas County, Oregon

References

1892 establishments in Oregon
Barns on the National Register of Historic Places in Oregon
Buildings and structures completed in 1892
National Register of Historic Places in Douglas County, Oregon
Barns in Oregon